Josef Boleslav Pecka (19 September 1849 – 25 July 1897) was a Czech journalist, poet and social democratic politician.

References

1849 births
1897 deaths
Journalists from Prague
Czech male poets
Czech Social Democratic Party politicians
Politicians from Prague
People from the Kingdom of Bohemia
Leaders of the Czech Social Democratic Party
Austro-Hungarian emigrants to the United States